Dhoby Ghaut is a place in Georgetown, Penang, Malaysia. It also known as Vannan Thora Tedal ('laundry district') among the local Indian community.

Location
Dhobby Ghaut is located between Jalan Air Hitam and York Road. It lies at the confluence of Sungai Air Itam and Sungai Air Terjun, from where Sungai Pinang emerges. A few laundries still operate there. Many people who live there work in the traditional Indian laundry service providers who have been operating there generations after generations.

Etymology 
Dhoby Ghaut or Dhobī Ghāṭ literally means "washing place" in Hindi, from dhobī "washerman" or one that does laundry, and ghāṭ, generically meaning a large open space.

Temples
This place hosts two Hindu temples, Naduthurai Sri Devi Karumariamman and Sri Rama Temple. These temples were built by dhobies.

See also
 Dhoby Ghaut, Singapore
 Dhobi Ghat, Mumbai, India

References

 

George Town, Penang
Populated places in Penang
Indian diaspora in Malaysia
Ethnic enclaves in Malaysia
Laundry places